Ahmed ibn Muhammad ibn Khalifa was the progenitor of the ruling Al Khalifa family of Bahrain and the first monarch or hakim of Bahrain. All of the Al Khalifa monarchs of Bahrain are his descendant. He is commonly referred to as Ahmed al-Fateh (Ahmed the Conqueror) for conquering Bahrain.

Early life
Ahmed ibn Muhammed ibn Khalifa was born in Kuwait in the first half of the 18th century.

Siege of Zubarah 1783

When Nasr Al-Madhkur – whom the Zands had appointed as Bahrain's governor – besieged Zubara in 1783, he was defeated and driven away by an army under the command of Ahmed ibn Muhammad ibn Khalifa, who continued his victories and conquered Bahrain in 1783.

Reign
Sheikh Ahmed, through his successful conquest of Bahrain in 1783, restored Bahrain’s Arab independence and sovereignty. He was based in Al Zubarah on the Qatari Peninsula, an enclave and city state his father built after his departure from Kuwait. Sheikh Ahmed appointed a keeper, Ajaj, whose descendants still live in Bahrain, to Bahrain’s Al Diwan Fort. He appointed a relation, Ali bin Faris to govern Bahrain on his behalf. As for his former opponent, Nasir ibn Madhkur, who had blockaded Al Zubarah the previous year, he allowed him to sail back to Bushire in Persia without any harm.

Sheikh Ahmed used to spend the winter in Zubarah, but the spring and summer seasons in Bahrain. The famous hunting ground where Sheikh Ahmed used to hunt was named “Jari Al Sheikh Ahmed”, in his honor. Though the former hunting ground is currently an affluent and popular residential neighborhood in Bahrain’s Southern Governorate, it still carries Sheikh Ahmed’s name. 

Sheikh Ahmed had proposed while in Qatar to build a canal to separate the Qatari peninsula from the mainland of the Arabian Peninsula in an attempt to prevent Wahhabi control of Bahrain and Qatar. At the time, the Wahhabi movement was slowly gaining momentum in Nejd or Central Arabia and Sheikh Ahmed was vigilant to protect his territories from foreign control.

Death and burial
Shaikh Ahmed died during the summer of 1795, reportedly after a severe heart attack he had after finishing his afternoon meal which he had consumed after the afternoon prayers. He was buried in Manama next to a well known grave of a pious religious scholar.

Children
He had five children: Abdullah, Salman, Mohamed and Yousif. His only known daughter, Amna bint Ahmed, was married to Rashid Al Fadhil, a distant relation of Shaikh Ahmed. Her son, Abdulrahman Al Fadhel, later played a crucial role in Bahrain’s history by regaining Bahrain after it was briefly occupied by the Wahhabis in around 1809.

References

External links

18th-century monarchs in the Middle East
1795 deaths
Bahraini monarchs
House of Khalifa
18th century in Bahrain